"Steal My Sunshine" is a song by Canadian alternative rock band Len from their third studio album, You Can't Stop the Bum Rush (1999). The song was initially released on the soundtrack to the 1999 crime comedy film Go, which resulted in the song receiving heavy airplay. It was later released to contemporary hit radio as the lead single from You Can't Stop the Bum Rush on June 22, 1999, by Work Group. Marc Costanzo and Gregg Diamond are credited as songwriters, while production was helmed by Costanzo under the stage name Mumble C. According to Costanzo, the song is about feelings of elation he experienced while attending an outdoor electronic music festival.

The song was recorded at Four Ways Studio B and mixed by John King of the Dust Brothers at One on One South. "Steal My Sunshine" was one of the first demos recorded for You Can't Stop the Bum Rush, although the song almost remained unreleased due to it not making much of an impression on the band. An indie pop and dance-pop song, "Steal My Sunshine" features siblings Marc and Sharon Costanzo trading lead vocals. The song's instrumental backing track is a sample of Andrea True Connection's 1976 single "More, More, More," earning a posthumous writing credit for Diamond, who died three months before the album's release. The song was written during a period in which Marc and Sharon Costanzo were not speaking to one another.

"Steal My Sunshine" received positive reviews from music critics, who praised its sample usage and considered the song a quintessential summer hit. The song peaked at number nine on the US Billboard Hot 100, giving Len their first and only entry on the chart. As a result, Len is often deemed a one-hit wonder. Internationally, "Steal My Sunshine" was a top 40 hit in eight countries. The song remains Len's most successful single, being certified platinum by the Recording Industry Association of America (RIAA), the Australian Recording Industry Association (ARIA), and the British Phonographic Industry (BPI).

Background
Marc Costanzo went to a rave during a time when he and his sister Sharon had gone several months without speaking. While out, he was listening to old disco music with Brendan Canning, and heard the 1976 disco hit "More, More, More". Marc decided to loop part of the song's bridge and wrote and composed "Steal My Sunshine" over the instrumental. The song was recorded on a vintage early 1980s 8-track 1/2 inch recorder. Marc stated that "Steal My Sunshine" did not make much of an impression on him, so Len did not originally plan to release it. The master recording remained under his bed for months.

When producing "Steal My Sunshine", Marc Costanzo wanted to make a song similar to the Human League's 1981 synth-pop single "Don't You Want Me". As a result, the song's structure is characterized by alternating between male and female vocals from Marc and Sharon. Costanzo has explained that the lyrics were about the aforementioned rave and the events that took place there.

Production
The recording sessions for "Steal My Sunshine" took place at Four Ways Studio B. Production on the song was helmed by Marc Costanzo under the stage name Mumble C, with Costanzo also acting as a recording engineer. Recorded in 1996 on an eight-track tape, the song was one of the first demos recorded for You Can't Stop the Bum Rush. When speaking to The Washington Post, Sharon Costanzo described the recording sessions as being relaxed. She commented: "Marc just dragged me out of bed and into the studio one morning and said, 'Do you want to sing on this?' ... And as soon as we recorded the song, it was done for me. We both liked it, but then I never thought about it again." John King of the Dust Brothers was responsible for the mixing of the track, which was done at One on One South.

Composition

According to the sheet music published at Musicnotes.com by Alfred Publishing, the song is written in the key of E major and is set in the time signature of common time with a tempo of 95 beats per minute. Marc and Sharon Costanzo's vocal range spans one octave, from G4 to G5. Marc described the song as a "fun piece of pop with a bit of rap and disco thrown in."

Release and reception

Release
"Steal My Sunshine" was included on the soundtrack to Go, which was released on March 30, 1999, by Sony Music Entertainment. It received heavy airplay as a result, causing Sony's subsidiary The WORK Group to push the album's release date from mid-June 1999 to May 25, 1999. The song became Len's most successful, reaching the top 10 on the US Billboard Hot 100 in September 1999. It reached the top 10 on the Adult Top 40, Modern Rock Tracks, Top 40 Mainstream, and Top 40 Tracks charts. At the 2000 Juno Awards, "Steal My Sunshine" was nominated for "Best Single" but lost to the Tragically Hip's "Bobcaygeon".

Reception
"Steal My Sunshine" received positive reviews from music critics. Larry Flick from Billboard wrote, "It's hard to imagine that no one has thought of using the instrumental hook of (...) "More, More, More" to beef up a new concoction. Here, however, the quintet Len does so to grand effect. Somewhere between pop and modern rock, this all-about-summer track-featuring a back-and-forth male-to-female vocal-is uplifting, clever, and instantly appealing. Its melody line, verse construction, and memorable hook make for what should be an absolute breakthrough for this hip, talented act." Rob Brunner of Entertainment Weekly rated it a B+, describing it as a 1990s "Don't You Want Me" with a "smiley groove and alternating male/ female vocals". For The Village Voice, Richard Riegel described the song's beat as "McCoy Tyner playing the Kraftwerk songbook, outlined in aural neon." In her review for Rolling Stone, Karen Schoemer compared Sharon Costanzo's vocals to Josie and the Pussycats. The publication listed "Steal My Sunshine" tenth on its list of the best singles of 1999. The song was listed third on the 1999 Pazz and Jop list, a survey of several hundred music critics conducted by Robert Christgau.

Retrospectively, the single garnered high praise from AllMusic's Stephen Thomas Erlewine: "Then, there's Len's 'Steal My Sunshine,' as perfect as songs get. This sun-kissed, sun-bleached blend of hip-hop, pop, disco, post-Beastie Boys cleverness and California culture is a priceless, timeless confection that instantly calls up sweltering, shimmering beaches the second the looped keyboard plays. It's a monumentally great single...put it this way, if 'Steal My Sunshine' was the last song I ever heard on this earth, I'd die happy — and it shows that mainstream pop can truly be transcendent."

Legacy
In 2007, Stylus Magazine ranked the song 13th on its list of the top 50 one-hit wonders, stating that it "perfectly captured that warm, lazy feeling you get when late summer still seems like it could last forever."

In 2013, Rolling Stone magazine placed "Steal My Sunshine" at number 33 on their list of the "Best Summer Songs of All Time".

Music video
The song's music video—which uses the shorter "album edit" of the song, as featured on the single—was jointly directed by Marc Costanzo and Bradley Walsh under the respective stage names "The Burger Pimp" and "B-Rad". When Len had signed to Work Records, one of its demands was to be able to direct its own videos. The group used a $100,000 budget to make the video. They flew to Daytona Beach, Florida with two dozen friends while the area was crowded with people on their spring vacations. They spent much of the budget on alcohol, buying so much that they broke their hotel's elevator trying to lift it. They shot the video in the afternoon so that they could recover from hangovers in the morning and drink in the evening. The scenes were shot without a script or storyboard. In the video, Len and friends are shown relaxing together and riding on scooters, go-karts, and jet skis.

Motorrad, whose scooters were included in the music video, later held a promotion giving away scooters of the same model. At the 1999 MuchMusic Video Awards, "Steal My Sunshine" won awards for Best Video, Best Pop Video, and Favourite Canadian Video.

The music video for "Steal My Sunshine" that Walsh and Costanzo had jointly directed was also included as a bonus feature on the special edition DVD release of the film Go, although no scenes from the movie are featured in the music video.

Track listings and formats

 UK CD1
 "Steal My Sunshine" (Album Edit) – 3:30
 "It's Down to This"  – 4:04
 "Drunc'n Moves"  – 2:55

 UK CD2
 "Steal My Sunshine"  – 4:08
 "Steal My Sunshine" (Skyjump Club Edit) – 7:19
 "Steal My Sunshine" (Version Idjut) – 7:51

 UK 12-inch vinyl
 "Steal My Sunshine" (Skyjump Club Edit) – 7:19
 "Steal My Sunshine" (More and More Instrumental) – 6:45
 "Steal My Sunshine" (Album Version) – 3:55
 "Steal My Sunshine" (Version Idjut) – 7:51
 "Steal My Sunshine" (Bougie Soliterre Remix) – 6:12
 "Steal My Sunshine" (Neon Phusion Remix) – 5:24

 UK cassette single and European CD single
 "Steal My Sunshine" (Album Version) – 3:55
 "Steal My Sunshine" (Neon Phusion Remix) – 5:24

 US 12-inch vinyl
 "Steal My Sunshine" (Steal My Club Mix) – 6:19
 "Steal My Sunshine" (Skyjump Club Edit) – 7:19
 "Steal My Sunshine" (Steal My Club Mix Instrumental) – 6:19
 "Steal My Sunshine" (More and More Instrumental) – 6:30

 European maxi
 "Steal My Sunshine" (Album Edit) – 3:30
 "Steal My Sunshine" (Skyjump Club Edit) – 7:19
 "Steal My Sunshine" (Version Idjut) – 7:51
 "Steal My Sunshine" (Bougie Soliterre Remix) – 6:12

 Australian maxi
 "Steal My Sunshine" (Album Version) – 4:01
 "Steal My Sunshine" (Skyjump Club Edit) – 7:19
 "Steal My Sunshine" (Bougie Soliterre Remix) – 6:12
 "Steal My Sunshine" (Neon Phusion Remix) – 5:24

 Remixes, Vol. 1
 "Steal My Sunshine" (Junior Sanchez NJ Deep Mix) – 6:00
 "Steal My Sunshine" (Alexander Technique Darksun Remix - Jnr Edit) – 5:21
 "Steal My Sunshine" (Gina Turner Remix) – 4:50
 "Steal My Sunshine" (Remastered Version) – 3:31

 Remastered Anniversary Edition
 "Steal My Sunshine" (Remastered Anniversary Edition) – 3:21
 "Steal My Sunshine" (Remastered Anniversary Edition Instrumental) – 3:47

 California Realin' Remix
 "Steal My Sunshine" (California Realin' Remix) – 3:48
 "Steal My Sunshine" (Instrumental) – 3:27

Personnel
Personnel adapted from the You Can't Stop the Bum Rush album liner notes.

 Marc Costanzo – vocals
 Sharon Costanzo – vocals
 Matt Kelly – guitar, spoken interlude
 Brendan Canning – spoken interlude

Technical
 Marc Costanzo – producer, engineer
 John King – mixing
 Chris Shaw – engineer
 Tom Banghart – assistant engineer
 David Mitson – mastering

Charts

Weekly charts

Year-end charts

Certifications and sales

Release history

Covers
In 2021, "Steal My Sunshine" was covered by American alternative rock band Portugal. The Man in collaboration with Cherry Glazerr frontwoman Clementine Creevy. In 2022, Australian band The Goon Sax covered the song, released in the deluxe edition of their 2021 album Mirror II.

References

1999 singles
1999 songs
Columbia Records singles
Len (band) songs
Male–female vocal duets
Songs written by Gregg Diamond